This is a list of ARIA club chart number-one hits from 2005, which is collected from Australian Recording Industry Association (ARIA) from weekly DJ reports.

Chart

Number-one artists

See also
ARIA Charts
List of number-one singles of 2005 (Australia)
List of number-one albums of 2005 (Australia)
2005 in music

References

2005 Club
Australia Club Chart
2005 in Australian music